This is a list of castles in West Dunbartonshire.

List

See also
Castles in Scotland
List of castles in Scotland
List of listed buildings in West Dunbartonshire

Notes

References

Castles in West Dunbartonshire
West Dunbartonshire